Dakar Université Club (DUC) is a Senegalese football club based in Dakar.

They used to play in the top division until their relegation in 2014.

Performance in CAF competitions
CAF Confederation Cup: 1 appearance
2005 - Preliminary Round

Famous players
 Pape Demba Camara
 Pape Alioune Diouf
 Diarga Fall
 Fadel Fall
 Ibrahima Gueye
 Cheikh Ndiaye
 Babacar Niang
 Abdoulaye Touré
 Boubacar Dialiba

References

Sports clubs in Dakar
Football clubs in Senegal